There Is a Woman Who Never Forgets You (German: Es gibt eine Frau, die dich niemals vergißt) is a 1930 German drama film directed by Leo Mittler and starring Iván Petrovich, Lil Dagover and Helene Fehdmer. It was originally begun as a silent film shooting at the Staaken Studios before switching to sound at the newly converted Tempelhof Studios in Berlin. The film's sets were designed by the art directors Hans Sohnle and Otto Erdmann.

Cast
 Iván Petrovich as Georg Moeller - der Sohn  
 Lil Dagover as Tilly Ferrantes  
 Helene Fehdmer 
 Gaston Jacquet as Der Graf  
 Felix Bressart 
 Otto Wallburg 
 Hans Peppler 
 Franz Weber 
 Rolf Gert 
 Oskar Sima 
 Leda Gloria 
 Hadrian Maria Netto 
 Ellen Frank 
 Ernst Legal 
 Hermann Speelmans 
 Ernst Stahl-Nachbaur 
 Hans Halber
 Ernõ Szenes

References

Bibliography 
 Alfonso Canziani. Cinema di tutto il mondo. A. Mondadori, 1978.

External links 
 

1930 films
Films of the Weimar Republic
1930s German-language films
Films directed by Leo Mittler
Bavaria Film films
German black-and-white films
Films shot at Staaken Studios
Films shot at Tempelhof Studios
German drama films
1930 drama films